Guillermo Falasca Fernández (born October 24, 1977) is a Spanish volleyball player born in Argentina. Falasca became topscorer and best server at the 2005 European League, in which Spain ended up in third place in the overall-rankings.
And he was a member of South Korean Gumi LIG Insurance Greaters in the V-League 2007–08 season. A resident of Málaga he was a member of the Men's National Team that won the 2007 European title in Moscow, Russia.
He has two daughters, Alessia Falasca (2006) and Martina Falasca (2010).

References
 Guillermo Falasca Fernandez at the International Volleyball Federation

External links
 
 Guillermo Falasca at Lega Pallavolo Serie A

1977 births
Living people
Spanish men's volleyball players
Argentine men's volleyball players
Argentine emigrants to Spain
Sportspeople from Mendoza, Argentina
Mediterranean Games medalists in volleyball
Mediterranean Games silver medalists for Spain
Competitors at the 2005 Mediterranean Games
Competitors at the 2009 Mediterranean Games